The 1996 Louisville Cardinals football team represented the University of Louisville in the 1996 NCAA Division I-A football season. They participated as members of Conference USA. The team played their home games in Cardinal Stadium and were led by head coach Ron Cooper.

Schedule

Roster

References

Louisville
Louisville Cardinals football seasons
Louisville Cardinals football